Chariot is a co-op platform game for the PlayStation 4, PlayStation 3, Xbox One, Wii U and Microsoft Windows developed and published by Frima Studio, with the participation of the Canada Media Fund. It was first released on September 30, 2014 and was launched on Xbox One the next day as part of the Xbox Live Games with Gold program. An enhanced port entitled Super Chariot was released for the Nintendo Switch on May 10, 2018, and will include the Royal Gadget Pack DLC.

Chariot differs from most traditional Platform game as the objective is to lug around an object, the Chariot, to the end of each level. To do so, the players have to use physics-based mechanics such as pushing and pulling, adding a layer of Puzzle to the game.

Plot
Chariot chronicles a princess' quest to fulfill her recently deceased father's final wishes and bury him in peace. As might be expected of royalty, his last request is that he be laid to rest with as much wealth as possible.

Gameplay
The entire game can be played solo or with a partner. The king's body is in a coffin and attached to it are four wheels. The player's character can push the chariot up and down small hills or attach a rope to pull it along. The rope can be extended or shortened to adequately maneuver the chariot throughout the environment. Everything behaves as it should, with real physics playing a big part in how things move.

Reception
On Metacritic, Chariot scores an average metascore of 76 on PlayStation 4, Wii U and PC and 73 on Xbox One. It achieved an 8.5 from Destructoid, as "a memorable game that's hard not to like and recommend to others."

References

External links
 

2014 video games
Cooperative video games
Frima Studio games
Indie video games
Nintendo Switch games
Platform games
PlayStation 3 games
PlayStation 4 games
Side-scrolling video games
Video games developed in Canada
Video games featuring female protagonists
Wii U eShop games
Windows games
Xbox One games
Multiplayer and single-player video games